Zahnd is a surname. Notable people with the surname include:

Nicole Zahnd (born 1980), Swiss swimmer
Yves Zahnd (born 1985), Swiss footballer

See also
 Zahn